First Rays of the New Rising Sun is a compilation album credited to American rock musician Jimi Hendrix, issued in 1997 on MCA Records. Featuring songs mostly intended for his planned fourth studio album, it was one of the first releases overseen by Experience Hendrix, the family company that took over management of his recording legacy. It reached the album charts in the United States, United Kingdom, and four other countries.

Hendrix recorded most of the songs at his new Electric Lady Studios in New York City with former Jimi Hendrix Experience drummer Mitch Mitchell and Band of Gypsys bassist Billy Cox, his regular backing for the final six months. All of the songs had been released previously on Hendrix's first posthumous albums The Cry of Love, Rainbow Bridge, and War Heroes; Cry of Love appears here in its entirety but within a different running order. First Rays of the New Rising Sun superseded Voodoo Soup, the 1995 attempt by controversial interim Hendrix producer Alan Douglas, to realize Hendrix's fourth album.

Background
At the time of his death in 1970, Hendrix was working on enough songs for a double album, with one proposed title First Rays of the New Rising Sun. The tracks were in varying stages of development, with only about six believed to be near completion. Long-time Hendrix recording engineer Eddie Kramer and drummer Mitchell selected 17 of what they felt were the best tracks, which were first released on The Cry of Love, Rainbow Bridge, and War Heroes. From the 1970s through the 1990s, the songs also appeared on other posthumous compilations supervised by producer Alan Douglas, who wiped bass and drums performances by Mitchell, Cox and Miles and overdubbed them with parts newly recorded by session musicians. He also added female backing singers to one track, and claimed co-composer credit on several tracks. For the 1997 compilation, Kramer instead used the original master recordings and sequenced the songs to realize Hendrix's plans to the best of his abilities. He selected tracks based on their original level of completion and Hendrix's personal notes.

According to Richie Unterberger in his Rough Guide to Jimi Hendrix (2009), "Some Hendrix fans might take issue with First Rays of the New Rising Sun being classified as a compilation, rather than as a studio album, consisting as it does solely of studio recordings, most of them cut and/or polished shortly before his death in September 1970... Yet when all is said and done, [it] is not what Hendrix would have issued as his fourth album. No such record could be posthumously compiled, as nobody knows with absolute certainty what songs he would have included, and what additional production work he might have done on the ones he had laid down in the studio, no matter how complete they might have seemed to others."

Several additional songs that appeared on Hendrix's proposed track listings for his fourth studio album were later released by Experience Hendrix: "Valleys of Neptune", "Cherokee Mist", "Bleeding Heart","Hear My Train A Comin'" (also known as "Getting My Heart Back Together Again"), "Lover Man", "Midnight Lightning" (demo), and "Send My Love to Linda".  Another three, "Come Down Hard on Me Baby", "The Drifter's Escape", and "Burning Desire", were issued on Loose Ends (1974).

Release and reception
{{Album ratings
|rev1 = AllMusic
|rev1score = <ref name="Eder">{{AllMusic|class=album|id=r260055|tab=review|label=Album review Jimi Hendrix First Rays of the New Rising Sun|first=Bruce|last=Eder|access-date=6 September 2011}}</ref>
|rev2 = Blender|rev2Score = 
|rev3 = Down Beat|rev3Score = 
|rev4 = Encyclopedia of Popular Music|rev4Score = 
|rev5 = Los Angeles Times|rev5Score = 
|rev6 = PopMatters|rev6Score = 9/10
|rev7 = The Rolling Stone Album Guide|rev7Score = 
|rev8 = Tom Hull – on the Web|rev8Score = A−
}}
When First Rays of the New Rising Sun was released in 1997, it charted at number 49 on the Billboard 200 in the United States, and at number 37 on the UK Albums Charts in Britain. In 2010, the album was remastered and re-released by Sony Legacy and included a DVD with a mini-documentary titled An Inside Look: First Rays of the New Rising Sun.

According to Robert Christgau in Blender, First Rays of the New Rising Sun was Kramer's reimagination of Hendrix's projected double LP, which was not as remarkable musically as his last studio album Electric Ladyland (1968) and "not too profound lyrically". Nonetheless, Christgau deemed it a suitable successor to The Cry of Love, as well as "a powerful collection by a genius whose songwriting kept growing and whose solos rarely disappoint." Sean Murphy from PopMatters believed it was more successful than The Cry of Love in realizing Hendrix's vision. He highlighted the "liberating presence" of bassist Billy Cox, deeming him an improvement over Noel Redding. According to Murphy, Cox allowed the band to "spread out and chase the guitarist as he soars above, around and beneath them". Rolling Stone magazine called the album "a cohesive cosmic missive", writing that it "illuminates what would have been a transitional phase for Hendrix".

Track listing

Recording details

 Personnel 
From the original MCA Records First Rays of the New Rising Sun'' CD booklet:

Band members
 Jimi Hendrixlead vocals, guitar, bass guitar on "My Friend", backing vocals on "Earth Blues" and "In from the Storm", production, mixing on "Freedom", "Nightbird Flying", "Dolly Dagger", "Room Full of Mirrors", "Ezy Ryder"
 Billy Coxbass guitar (except "My Friend" and "Belly Button Window"), backing vocals on "Earth Blues" and "In from the Storm"
Mitch Mitchelldrums on all tracks (except "Room Full of Mirrors" and "Ezy Ryder"), production (except "Izabella", "Beginnings", "Stepping Stone"), mixing on "Angel"

Additional musicians
 Albert and Arthur Allen (the Ghetto Fighters)backing vocals on "Freedom", "Izabella", "Dolly Dagger", and "Stepping Stone"
The Ronettes (Veronica Bennett, Estelle Bennett, Nedra Talley)backing vocals on "Earth Blues"
 Juma Sultanpercussion on "Freedom", "Dolly Dagger",  "Beginnings", "Hey Baby (The New Rising Sun)", "Earth Blues", "Astro Man"
 Buddy Milesdrums on "Room Full of Mirrors" and "Ezy Ryder", backing vocals on "Earth Blues"
 Billy Armstrongpercussion on "Ezy Rider"
 Buzzy Linhartvibraphone on "Drifting"
 Emmeretta Marksbacking vocals on "In from the Storm"
Steve Winwoodbacking vocals on "Ezy Ryder"
Chris Woodbacking vocals on "Ezy Ryder"
Kenny Pinetwelve-string guitar on "My Friend"
Jimmy Mayesdrums on "My Friend"
Stephen Stillspiano on "My Friend"
Paul Carusoharmonica on "My Friend"

Additional personnel
 Eddie Kramerproducer, engineering, mixing, photography, remastering
 John Jansenproduction on "Izabella", "Room Full of Mirrors",	"Dolly Dagger", "Beginnings", "Stepping Stone", "Hey Baby (New Rising Sun)", "Earth Blues"; mixing on "Izabella", "Beginnings", "Stepping Stone", "Hey Baby (New Rising Sun)", "Earth Blues"
 Tony Bongioviengineering on "Room Full of Mirrors"
 Jack Abramsengineering on "Ezy Ryder" (1969)
 Bob Hughesengineering on "Ezy Ryder" (1970), "Earth Blues" (1970)
 Bob Cottoengineering on "Earth Blues" (1969)
 John McDermottliner notes, remastering supervisor

References

External links 
 

1997 compilation albums
Jimi Hendrix compilation albums
Albums produced by Eddie Kramer
Albums recorded at Electric Lady Studios
Compilation albums published posthumously
MCA Records compilation albums